The European Symposium on Fluorine Chemistry (ESFC) is a triennial academic conference on Fluorine chemistry founded in 1965. The conference is held in Europe, but traditionally it brings together the fluorine community from all over the world. The scientific programme of the Symposium covers all the areas of fluorine chemistry relevant to fundamental and applied research.

History 
The abstracts of 9th ESFC and 10th ESFC appeared as a special issue of the Journal of Fluorine Chemistry, a reference journal in the field; fluorine chemists Herbert W. Roesky and Giuseppe Resnati gave an invited lectures at the 18th ESFC (Kyiv, 2016); the Book of Abstracts of 18th ESFC can be tracked by its ISBN.

List of Symposia

References

Fluorine
Chemistry conferences